Moeritherium ("the beast from Lake Moeris") is an extinct genus of primitive proboscideans. These prehistoric mammals are related to the elephant and, more distantly, sea cows and hyraxes. They lived during the Eocene epoch.

Description
Moeritherium was a rotund semi-aquatic mammal with short, stubby legs that lived about 37-35 million years ago Its body shape and lifestyle demonstrate convergent evolution with pigs, tapirs, and the pygmy hippopotamus. The shape of their teeth suggests that they ate soft water vegetation.

The shape of the skull suggests that, while Moeritherium did not have an elephant-like trunk, it may have had a broad flexible upper lip like a tapir's for grasping aquatic vegetation. The second incisor teeth formed small tusks, although these would have looked more like the teeth of a hippo than a modern elephant.

Discovery
In 1901, Charles William Andrews described Moeritherium lyonsi from fossil remains found in the Qasr el Sagha Formation in the Al Fayyum in Egypt. Andrews described Moeritherium gracile from fossil remains of a smaller specimen found in the same area in 1902 in a fluvio-marine formation, that is a river estuary wetlands to brackish lagoon paleoenvironment. In 1904, the first Moeritherium trigodon fossils were discovered by Charles Andrews in the deposits of an oasis in Al Fayyum. It is also found in other sites around North and West Africa. In 1911, Max Schlosser of Munich divided Moeritherium lyonsi into two species: Moeritherium lyonsi, a large form from the Qasr-el-Sagha formation, and a new large species M. andrewsi from a fluvio-marine formation. In 2006, Moeritherium chehbeurameuri has been described from fossil remains found in the early late Eocene locality of Bir El Ater, Algeria.

Classification
Moeritherium is not thought to be directly ancestral to modern elephants; it was a branch of Proboscidea that died out, leaving no descendants. There were several species of other primitive proboscideans in existence during the Eocene, and some, such as Phiomia and Palaeomastodon, looked comparatively more like modern elephants. However, Moeritherium was clearly a side branch of the proboscidean family tree, having evolved to resemble other rotund semiaquatic mammals such as pigs, tapirs, and hippos instead of having the typical proboscidean body form.

References

Eocene proboscideans
Eocene mammals of Africa
Prehistoric placental genera
Transitional fossils
Taxa named by Charles William Andrews
Fossil taxa described in 1901